Paschal Baylón  (16 May 1540 – 17 May 1592) was a Spanish Roman Catholic lay professed religious of the Order of Friars Minor. He served as a shepherd alongside his father in his childhood and adolescence, but desired to enter the religious life. He was refused once but later was admitted as a Franciscan lay brother and became noted for his strict austerities, as well as his love for and compassion towards the sick.
He was sent to counter the arguments of the Calvinists in France but was chased out and nearly killed by a mob. He was best known for his strong and deep devotion to the Eucharist.

The process for his canonization opened and in 1618 he was beatified; Pope Alexander VIII canonized him a saint on 16 October 1690.

Early life 
Paschal Baylón was born on 16 May 1540 at Torrehermosa, in the Kingdom of Aragon, on the feast of the Pentecost to the poor but pious peasants Martin and Elizabeth Jubera Baylón. He was named Paschal in honour of Pascua de Pentecosta, for local custom required that a child be called after the saint or feast day on which it was born. He had a brother and two sisters.

From his seventh to his twenty-fourth year, he led the life of a shepherd, and during the whole of that period exercised a salutary influence upon his companions.

Someone had given him a book of the Little Office of the Blessed Virgin Mary. He learned to read by asking people for help with the words. Not having any other means to relieve the poor, he always gave them a part of his own dinner which was sent him into the fields. To help support the family, Paschal was hired out by his father to tend the flocks of others. Some of his companions were much inclined to cursing, quarrelling, and fighting; but learnt to hold their tongue in his presence since they respected his pious nature and his virtue. He was extremely honest, even offering to compensate owners of crops for any damage that his sheep caused.

Friar 
Those to whom he first mentioned his inclination to a religious life, recommended several richly endowed monasteries, but he answered,"I was born poor and am resolved to die in poverty and penance".

He was at first denied the chance to join the Franciscans on account of his age, prompting him to return to his duties as a shepherd. In 1564 he joined the Reformed Franciscans as a religious brother and commenced his period of novitiate on 2 February before making his profession on 2 February 1565 in Orito at the Saint Joseph convent. He was urged to become an ordained priest but he felt that was not the path for him. 

He had never more than one habit, and that always threadbare; he walked without sandals in the snow. He accommodated himself to all places and seasons. His jobs included serving as a cook and gardener as well as the official beggar who went around asking for alms. As porter his duties entailed tending to the poor who came to the friars' door. Paschal gained a reputation for his remarkable humility, unfailing courtesy, and generosity.

He lived this life in contemplation and silent meditation, often as he worked. He was a contemplative and had frequent ecstatic visions. He would spend the night before the altar in silence some nights. But he also shrugged off those notions of him gaining a reputation coming from that pious nature. On one occasion, in the course of a journey through France, he defended the dogma of the Real Presence against a Calvinist preacher, and in consequence, narrowly escaped death at the hands of a Huguenot mob.

He died on 17 May 1592 after falling ill; this day is also his feast day.

Veneration 

His tomb in Villarreal became an immediate place of pilgrimage and there were soon miracles that were reported at his tomb. Pope Paul V beatified him on 29 October 1618, and Pope Alexander VIII canonized him on 16 October 1690. In 1730, an indigenous Guatemalan claimed to have had a vision of a sainted Paschal appearing as a robed skeleton. This event became the basis of the heterodox tradition of San Pascualito.

Pope Leo XIII, in the Apostolic Brief Providentissimus Deus on 28 November 1897.> proclaimed the saint as the "seraph of the Eucharist" as well as the patron of Eucharistic congresses and affiliated associations. Art often depicts him wearing the Franciscan habit and bearing a monstrance to signify his devotion to the Holy Eucharist. Pope John XXIII named the saint as the patron for the Segorbe diocese on 12 May 1961.

During the Red Terror, at the time of the Spanish Civil War, his grave was desecrated and anticlerical leftists had his relics burned, though some remained. Those that did were later transferred in the presence of King Juan Carlos I on 12 May 1992.

Towns 
 San Pascual, Batangas, Philippines
 Saint-Pascal, Quebec, Canada
 Saint-Pascal Baylon, Ontario, Canada
 San Pascual, Burias Island, Masbate, Philippines
 San Pascual, Obando, Bulacan, Philippines
 San Pascual Baylon, Guinarona Dagami, Leyte

See also 
Saints of Obando
Sanctuary of St. Paschal Baylon

Notes and references

External links 

 Catholic Online
 Roman Catholic Saints

1540 births
1592 deaths
16th-century Christian saints
16th-century Spanish people
16th-century venerated Christians
Friars Minor
Canonizations by Pope Alexander VIII
Spanish Franciscans
Spanish Roman Catholic saints
Venerated Catholics
Franciscan saints